Lysimachia nummularia is a species of flowering plant in the primrose family Primulaceae. Its common names include moneywort, creeping jenny, herb twopence and twopenny grass.

Description
It has rounded leaves arranged in opposite pairs, and cup-shaped yellow flowers 2 cm in diameter, in summer. It is particularly associated with damp or even wet areas, though in cultivation it will tolerate drier conditions.

Distribution
It is native to Europe, but has been introduced to North America, where it is considered an invasive species in some areas. It aggressively spreads in favorable conditions, such as low wet ground or near ponds. It is moderately difficult to remove by hand pulling. Any tiny piece left behind will regrow.

Etymology
The Latin specific epithet nummularia means "like a coin", referring to the shape of the leaves; hence the common names, such as "moneywort", which also references coins.

Cultivation
The cultivar 'Aurea' (golden creeping Jenny) It is cultivated as an ornamental plant, for groundcover where the range of its growth can be limited. It is also suitable as a bog garden or aquatic marginal plant. has yellow leaves, and is somewhat less aggressive than the species. It has gained the Royal Horticultural Society's Award of Garden Merit.

Chemistry
The plant contains a number of phenolic acids.

References

External links

Jepson Manual Treatment (invasive species)
U.C. Photos gallery

nummularia
Flora of Europe
Medicinal plants of Europe
Plants described in 1753
Taxa named by Carl Linnaeus
Garden plants of Europe